Inday Will Always Love You (International title: Happy Together) is a 2018 Philippine television drama romance comedy series broadcast by GMA Network. Directed by Monti Puno Parungao and Rember Gelera, it stars Barbie Forteza in the title role. It premiered on May 21, 2018 on the network's Telebabad line up replacing The One That Got Away. The series concluded on October 5, 2018 with a total of 100 episodes. It was replaced by Pamilya Roces in its timeslot.

The series is streaming online on YouTube.

Premise
Happylou moves to Cebu in order to help her family who lives beside a train track. She also starts searching for her father that she has never met. She will eventually meet the people that will give answers to her lifelong questions.

Cast and characters 

Lead cast
 Barbie Forteza as  Happylou "Inday" M. Fuentes-Melendez

Supporting cast
 Derrick Monasterio as Patrick Melendez
 Juancho Trivino as Ernest Pascual
 Ricky Davao as Philip Fuentes
 Gladys Reyes as Amanda Melendez
 Manilyn Reynes as Marta Magtibay-Fuentes
 Nova Villa as Loleng Magtibay
 Tina Paner as Madonna
 Kim Rodriguez as Ericka Ferraren
 Super Tekla as Kimberlou / Dominador
 Sherliz Simon as Happyliz “Lizliz” Magtibay
 Buboy Villar as Paeng

 Kimpoy Feliciano as Frank Santiago / Rocky
 Charice Hermoso as Kisses
 Charlotte Hermoso as Tricia
 Vangie Labalan as Tessa

Guest cast
 Ex Battalion as themselves
 Archie Alemania as Archie
 Archie Adamos as a demolition leader
 Sue Prado as Keri
 Carmelo Gutierrez as Chosa
 Antonette Garcia as Chubbyleta
 Sanya Lopez as Lea
 Solenn Heussaff as Joanna
 Christopher Roxas as Byron
 Arny Ross as Gina
 Nina Ricci Alagao as Christina Lazo
 Wendell Ramos as Perry Fuentes
 Lharby Policarpio as David
 Tonio Quiazon as General
 Ayra Mariano as Sunshine Fuentes
 Giselle Sanchez as Lorna
 Beverly Salviejo as Dixy
 Kim Domingo as Chuchay
 Andrea del Rosario as Amelia
 Bryan Benedict as Lando
 Jet Alcantara as Isko
 Omar Flores as Ton
 Kristoffer King as Boyet
 Alma Concepcion as Marcy Ferraren
 Alexander Lee as a tourist
 Dasuri Choi as a tourist
 Katrina Halili as herself
 Betong Sumaya as Britney
 Lovi Poe as Lovejoy
 Epi Quizon as Volta
 Divine Aucina as a wet market vendor
 Jade Lopez as a wet market vendor
 Boobay as Norman
 Therese Malvar as young Amanda
 Maey Bautista as the host of 'Search for Carcarian Queen'
 Franchesca Salcedo as Jing
 Thea Tolentino as Ruby
 Tony Mabesa as San Pedro
 Jean Garcia as Florence 
 Kyline Alcantara as Leslie Anne
 Jason Abalos as Russell
 Victor Neri as Budots
 Lotlot de Leon as D
 Keempee de Leon as Joaquin
 Angelu de Leon as Ricka
 Pen Medina as Afredo
 Ruru Madrid as Pabs
 Willie Revillame as himself
 Sunshine Dizon as Martina Lazo
 Nonong de Andres as Teggy

Accolades

Ratings
According to AGB Nielsen Philippines' Nationwide Urban Television People audience shares, the pilot episode of Inday Will Always Love You earned a 42% rating. The series got its highest rating on May 25, 2018 with a 51.5% rating. While based from People television homes, the final episode scored a 10.8% rating. The series had its highest rating on May 28, 2018 with an 11.1% rating.

References

External links
 
 

2018 Philippine television series debuts
2018 Philippine television series endings
Filipino-language television shows
GMA Network drama series
GMA Integrated News and Public Affairs shows
Philippine romantic comedy television series
Television shows set in Cebu